The men's double trap event at the 2008 Summer Olympics took place on August 12 at the Beijing Shooting Range Clay Target Field. Walton Eller, the gold medal winner in this event, broke two Olympic records for both the qualification and final rounds.

The event consisted of two rounds: a qualifier and a final. In the qualifier, each shooter fired 3 sets of 50 shots in trap shooting. Shots were paired, with two targets being launched at a time.

The top 6 shooters in the qualifying round moved on to the final round. There, they fired one additional round of 50. The total score from all 200 shots was used to determine final ranking. Ties are broken using a shoot-off; additional shots are fired one pair at a time until there is no longer a tie.

Records
Prior to this competition, the existing world and Olympic records were as follows.

During the competition, Walton Eller broke both Olympic records by a one-hit margin.

Qualification round
The qualification round was held between 9:00 and 13:00 China Standard Time (UTC+8). It consisted of three programs of 25 doubles each. In the A and B programs, the two targets were simultaneously thrown with a difference of five degrees (one straight and one to the side); in the C program, this was increased to ten degrees (one to each side).

OR Olympic record – Q Qualified for final

Final
The final was held at 15:00 China Standard Time (UTC+8). It repeated the C program for the top 6 shooters, and added the results to those of the qualification round.

OR Olympic record

References

Shooting at the 2008 Summer Olympics
Men's events at the 2008 Summer Olympics